Marcelo Fazzio Sarvas (born October 16, 1981) is a former Brazilian footballer who is currently the head coach for LA Galaxy II in MLS Next Pro.

Club career
Marcelo Sarvas began his career with Brazil's SC Corinthians Paulista debuting for the first team during the 2002 season. In 2003 the attacking midfielder joined Esporte Clube Noroeste and remained at the club for one year before leaving for Europe.

Europe
Sarvas signed for Swedish side Karlskrona AIF and remained at the club for one season before joining Kristianstads FF. In his first season with Kristianstad Sarvas scored 10 goals and helped the club gain promotion to the Swedish football Division 1. His play did not go unnoticed by higher level Swedish clubs including Mjällby AIF who signed Sarvas for the 2007 season.

In 2008, he once again transferred to another club in Sweden Bunkeflo IF. He was a top player for Bunkeflo and caught the eye of Polish top-flight club Polonia Warszawa. He appeared in 28 league matches for Polonia Warszawa scoring 2 goals, and in 6 UEFA Europe League matches scored 2 goals.

After two years in Poland, Sarvas returned to America this time joining Costa Rica's L.D. Alajuelense. Sarvas was given the number 10 jersey and became an instrumental player for Alajuelense and helped the club proclaim itself Verano 2011 Champion. He also was a key player in the clubs CONCACAF Champions League run, attracting the interest of other top clubs in North America, including Major League Soccer Champion Los Angeles Galaxy.

Major League Soccer
On December 6, 2011, it was announced that Sarvas had signed for Los Angeles Galaxy in Major League Soccer. Sarvas stayed with Los Angeles for three seasons, winning two MLS Cup championships.

On January 15, 2015, he was traded with an international roster spot to Colorado Rapids in exchange for allocation money and the #3 ranking in the allocation ranking.

On 1 February 2016, Colorado traded Sarvas to D.C. United in exchange for targeted allocation money and a conditional 2018 MLS SuperDraft pick. He scored his only goal for D.C. United against the New York Red Bulls by a penalty kick in the 70th minute. The game ended in a 2–2 tie. He was out of contract with United following the 2017 season.

Post career 
As of 10 April 2020, Sarvas is listed as U-19 Coach for the Colorado Rapids Youth Development Staff. 

Sarvas joined LA Galaxy's Academy coaching staff on 1 July 2020.

On 26 August 2022, Sarvas was named head coach of LA Galaxy II in the USL Championship, replacing Yoann Damet who was added to the first team staff. Sarvas had previously served as U-17 and U-19 manager in the Galaxy Academy.

Honours

Corinthians
Copa do Brasil: 2002

L.D. Alajuelense
Invierno: 2011
Verano: 2011

Los Angeles Galaxy
MLS Cup: 2012, 2014

References

External links
 
 Marcelo's Sarvas website
 

1981 births
Living people
Brazilian footballers
Brazilian expatriate footballers
Brazilian expatriate sportspeople in the United States
Sport Club Corinthians Paulista players
Esporte Clube Noroeste players
Mjällby AIF players
Polonia Warsaw players
L.D. Alajuelense footballers
LA Galaxy players
LA Galaxy II players
Colorado Rapids players
D.C. United players
Expatriate footballers in Poland
Expatriate footballers in Sweden
Brazilian expatriate sportspeople in Poland
Expatriate footballers in Costa Rica
Expatriate soccer players in the United States
Ekstraklasa players
Liga FPD players
Major League Soccer players
USL Championship players
Footballers from São Paulo
Association football midfielders
Brazilian expatriate football managers
Expatriate soccer managers in the United States
USL Championship coaches
LA Galaxy II coaches
Colorado Rapids non-playing staff
LA Galaxy non-playing staff